The Kedah River is a river in Kedah, Malaysia. The river passes through Alor Setar and empties into the Straits of Malacca at Kuala Kedah. Its volume is about 3695 km³.

See also
 List of rivers of Malaysia

References

Rivers of Kedah
Rivers of Malaysia